Holger Askehave (4 September 1900 – 16 December 1978) was a Danish wrestler. He competed in the Greco-Roman lightweight event at the 1924 Summer Olympics.

References

External links
 

1900 births
1978 deaths
Olympic wrestlers of Denmark
Wrestlers at the 1924 Summer Olympics
Danish male sport wrestlers
Sportspeople from Aarhus
20th-century Danish people